Deïmachus may refer to several figures in Greek mythology:

Deimachus, father of Enarete, wife of Aeolus.
Deimachus, a Pylian prince and one of the sons of King Neleus and Chloris, daughter of Amphion. He was the brother of Alastor, Asterius, Epilaus, Eurybius, Eurymenes, Evagoras, Nestor, Periclymenus, Phrasius, Pylaon, Taurus and Pero. Along with his father and other brothers, except Nestor, he was by killed Heracles during the sack of Pylos.
Deimachus, king of Tricca in Thessaly. He was the father of Autolycus, Deileon (Demoleon) and Phlogius, comrades of Heracles on his campaign against the Amazons.
Deimachus, a Boeotian son of Eleon and a companion of Heracles. When the hero took part an expedition against Troy, Deimachus fell in battle. He left a son Scamander born from his lover of Glaucia, daughter of the river god Scamander.

See also
Deimachus was also the name of the 3rd century BCE ambassador of the Seleucid Empire in India.

Notes

References 

Apollonius Rhodius, Argonautica translated by Robert Cooper Seaton (1853-1915), R. C. Loeb Classical Library Volume 001. London, William Heinemann Ltd, 1912. Online version at the Topos Text Project.
Apollonius Rhodius, Argonautica. George W. Mooney. London. Longmans, Green. 1912. Greek text available at the Perseus Digital Library.
Plutarch, Moralia with an English Translation by Frank Cole Babbitt. Cambridge, MA. Harvard University Press. London. William Heinemann Ltd. 1936. Online version at the Perseus Digital Library. Greek text available from the same website.
Pseudo-Apollodorus, The Library with an English Translation by Sir James George Frazer, F.B.A., F.R.S. in 2 Volumes, Cambridge, MA, Harvard University Press; London, William Heinemann Ltd. 1921. Online version at the Perseus Digital Library. Greek text available from the same website.

Neleides
Kings in Greek mythology
Boeotian characters in Greek mythology
Pylian characters in Greek mythology
Thessalian characters in Greek mythology